was a Japanese samurai bureaucrat and daimyō of the Edo period.

He was in charge of silver mines at Sagami after 1601, at Sado after 1603 and at Izu after 1606.  He expanded production at each mine.

After his death, evidence of misconduct was found.  His fief was confiscated and his sons were ordered to commit suicide.

References

Daimyo
Hatamoto
1545 births
1613 deaths
Ōkubo clan